Let the Truth Be Told may refer to:

 Let the Truth Be Told (Z-Ro album), a 2005 album by Z-Ro
 Let the Truth Be Told (Laura Izibor album), a 2009 album by Laura Izibor

See also
 Truth Be Told (disambiguation)